Thomas Iannucci (formerly Illtalian) is a two-time Nā Hōkū Hanohano award-winning rapper from Kaua’i, Hawaii. Iannucci has been the recipient of several notable awards, including the Nā Hōkū Hanohano Awards for Best Hip Hop Album in 2018 (under the name Illtalian) and 2020, as well as the Best Hip Hop Song (Finalist) in the 2016 National John Lennon Songwriting Contest (again as Illtalian). Iannucci was also a member of the Rapzilla Freshman Class of 2020, wherein he won the popular vote portion of the process. Iannucci is also an outspoken advocate for social issues within Hawaii, and was named by KHON2 News as part of the next generation of rappers pushing the limits of Hawaii Hip Hop.

Awards and nominations 

Iannucci has won or been nominated for several major awards, including the John Lennon Songwriting Contest, the International Songwriting Contest, and the SongDoor Songwriting Contest. In 2018, he won the Nā Hōkū Hanohano Award for Best Hip Hop Album for his album "Makana." In 2020, he was named a Rapzilla Freshman after winning the popular vote. His second album, “Kuleana,” also won the Hōkū for Hip Hop Album of the Year at the 2020 Nā Hōkū Hanohano Awards. In 2022, Iannucci's album “The Illyindé Tape” was also nominated for a Hōkū.

Personal life 
Thomas Iannucci began rapping in high school, under the name Illtalian. In 2018, Iannucci dropped the name Illtalian in favor of his birth name. Iannucci currently resides on the island of Kaua'i, and is a graduate of Waimea High School and the University of Hawaii at Manoa. He became engaged to April Villagomez in February 2020, and married her in December of the same year. They divorced in 2023.

Discography 

 Notti Insonni (2014)
 Makana (2017)
 Kuleana (2019)
Doubting Thomas (2020)
The Illyindé Tape (2021)

References

Rappers from Hawaii
Year of birth missing (living people)
Living people